Ialibu-Pangia District is a district of the Southern Highlands Province of Papua New Guinea. Its capital is Ialibu. The population was 70,000 as of the 2015 census.

References

Districts of Papua New Guinea
Southern Highlands Province